The National Registry of Emergency Medical Technicians is a US certification agency covering prehospital medical providers.

History 
The NREMT was established in 1970 in response to a recommendation from President Lyndon Johnson's Committee on Highway Traffic Safety that a national certifying agency for Emergency Medical Technicians be created in order to establish and standardize training requirements.

National Standard Curriculum as defined by the Department of Transportation - National Highway Traffic Safety Administration (NHTSA)

Standards 
Most states use or require NREMT testing for some level of state certification. NREMT recognizes four levels of EMS: EMR, EMT, Advanced EMT, and Paramedic (some states may have additional certifications). NREMT certification at an EMT Intermediate level may or may not be sufficient for some state EMT-I requirements. While NREMT certification may be mandatory for new state certification, it is not necessarily required for renewals. These procedures and requirements vary from state to state. In 1986, military emergency rooms were required to certify all medical technicians through NREMT.

Levels of Certification
 Nationally Registered Emergency Medical Responder (NREMR): This is the entry level into emergency medical services (EMS).  They are trained in CPR, advanced first aid, automated external defibrillator usage, and patient assessment.  Most police and fire services require their employees to be emergency medical responders at a minimum. This course is usually 40–60 hours in length.
 Nationally Registered Emergency Medical Technician (NREMT): This level of certification provides basic life support.
 Nationally Registered Advanced Emergency Medical Technician (NRAEMT)
 Nationally Registered Paramedic (NRP)

EMS-ID 
The NREMT launched the EMS-ID system on January 23, 2020, modeled after the National Provider Identifier (NPI). The idea was that one identifier could be issued to a verified individual upon creation of an NREMT account, which could then reference all certifications for that person. The number would remain constant, even if the individual changed their name, national certification level, etc. Similar to the NPI number issued by the Centers for Medicare and Medicaid Services (CMS), the number is a 12-position, intelligence-free numeric identifier (12-digit number). The EMS-ID is not intended to replace the individual registry number.

Controversy
The NREMT was criticized in 2010 for failing to prevent cheating during some exams. The Washington, D.C. Fire Department was investigated for cheating on the NREMT certification exam; however, an extensive investigation by the NREMT, Pearson VUE (the test administrator), with assistance from the DC Fire and EMS department and the DC police, revealed no evidence of cheating at Pearson VUE's LaPlata, MD testing center.

The NREMT works with the EMS community to implement the National EMS System including the EMS Agenda for the Future, EMS Education Agenda: A Systems Approach, and National Scope of Practice Model.

See also 
 National Association of Emergency Medical Technicians (NAEMT)
 Medic
 Combat medic
 Star of Life
 Ambulance
 Emergency medical services
 Emergency medical services in the United States
 Emergency medical technician
 National Registry Emergency Medical Technician
 Emergency medical technician – intermediate
 EMT-Paramedic

References

External links 
 
 Emergency Medical Service (EMS) Providers

Allied health professions-related professional associations
Emergency medical services in the United States
Healthcare accreditation organizations in the United States
Medical and health organizations based in Ohio